State Highway 96 (SH 96), also known as League City Parkway, is a state highway in the U.S. state of Texas.

Route description
SH 96 begins in League City at  I-45, just south of the Harris County line. From here, the highway travels to the east, crossing  SH 3. It then passes over the Union Pacific Railroad line and has an incomplete interchange with the parallel Dickinson Avenue; access to the street is available from westbound SH 96 only, while traffic on the street can enter only eastbound SH 96. The route then crosses  FM 270 before turning to the northeast, passing the site of the former Houston Gulf Airport. After intersections with several other surface streets, including the Columbia Memorial Parkway, SH 96 ends at  SH 146/future SH 99 at the city line between League City and Kemah.

History
SH 96 was designated along its current route on April 28, 1994.

The SH 96 designation was previously used on a route from Raymondville to Harlingen, mainly along the Gulf Coast, beginning on June 16, 1924. On February 22, 1928, it was extended north to the Kenedy County Line. On March 19, 1930, a section from Chapman Ranch to Corpus Christi was added, replacing that section of SH 57 and creating a gap. On April 1, 1931, the sections were connected. On August 3, 1932, the connecting section was to go through Rivera. The connecting section was finally added to the state highway log on November 30, 1932. On April 19, 1935, SH 96 was rerouted to go through Bishop. On July 15, 1935, the section from Chapman Ranch to Bishop was cancelled. The route was truncated to Robstown on September 26, 1939, with an already-constructed section between Corpus Christi and Chapman Ranch transferred to SH 286. SH 96 was instead extended to Sinton, replacing a portion of SH 44. This was redesignated as U.S. Highway 77 on June 30, 1945 when that route was extended south.

A section of FM 1266 shared a concurrency with SH 96, providing access to  FM 646 to the south and  FM 518 to the north. This concurrency was removed on May 29, 2003 when sections of FM 1266 within League City were returned to the city's jurisdiction.

Major intersections

References

096
Greater Houston
Galveston Bay Area
Transportation in Galveston County, Texas
U.S. Route 77